Monostiolum tessellatum is a species of sea snail, a marine gastropod mollusk in the family Pisaniidae.

Description
The length of the shell attains 18 mm.

Distribution
This species occurs in the Caribbean Sea, the Gulf of Mexico and the Lesser Antilles.

References

 Reeve, L. 1844. Monograph of the genus Triton Conchologia Iconica 2 pls. 1-20 
 Reeve, L. 1845. Monograph of the genus Pleurotoma Conchologia Iconica 1 pls. 19-33 
 Watters G.T. & Finlay C.J. (1989) A revision of the western Atlantic Recent species of the genus Monostiolum Dall, 1904, and Bailya (Parabailya) new subgenus (Gastropoda: Buccinidae). The Veliger 32(1): 47–59.

External links
  Watters, G. T. (2009). A revision of the western Atlantic Ocean genera Anna, Antillophos, Bailya, Caducifer, Monostiolum, and Parviphos, with description of a new genus, Dianthiphos, and notes on Engina and Hesperisternia Gastropoda: Buccinidae: Pisaniinae) and Cumia (Colubrariidae). The Nautilus. 123(4): 225-275
  Rosenberg, G., F. Moretzsohn, and E. F. García. 2009. Gastropoda (Mollusca) of the Gulf of Mexico, Pp. 579–699 in Felder, D.L. and D.K. Camp (eds.), Gulf of Mexico–Origins, Waters, and Biota. Biodiversity. Texas A&M Press, College Station, Texas.

Pisaniidae
Gastropods described in 1844